Nancy Clarke may refer to:
 Nancy Clarke (1945–2014), White House Chief Floral Designer

 Nancy Clarke (entrepreneur) (fl. 1791–1812), Barbadian free woman of colour and hotelier
 Nancy Clarke (swimmer), American competitor at the 1988 Summer Paralympics

See also
 Nancy Clark (disambiguation)